Hypera is a genus of clover and alfalfa weevils in the beetle family Curculionidae. There are at least 280 described species in Hypera.

See also
 List of Hypera species

References

Further reading

External links

 

Hyperinae
Articles created by Qbugbot